Dorypterus is a small, extinct genus of prehistoric ray-finned bony fish. It lived during the Wuchiapingian stage of the late Permian epoch in what is now Germany (Kupferschiefer) and England (Marl Slate). It is a hypsisomatic bobasatraniiform with a high dorsal fin. Due to anatomical differences with other bobasatraniiforms, such as the presence of pelvic fins and the reduced scale cover, Dorypterus is placed in its own monotypic family, Dorypteridae.

Two species are known, D. hoffmanni and D. althausi, which are distinguished by differences in length of the dorsal fin. Whereas D. hoffmanni has a long dorsal fin, the dorsal fin of D. althausi is short. However, it is possible that this difference is due to sexual dimorphism, and that D. althausi represents the female phenotype of D. hoffmanni.

References

See also
 Prehistoric fish
 List of prehistoric bony fish

Prehistoric bony fish genera
Permian bony fish